This is a list of plays directed by Ingmar Bergman.

Television theatre

Stage and radio theatre productions
List of plays that Ingmar Bergman directed for the stage and/or radio theatre.

 Outward Bound (Mäster Olofs-gården; 1938)
 The Man Who Lived His Life Over (Mäster Olofs-gården; 1939)
 Christmas/Advent (Mäster Olofs-gården; 1939)
 Autumn Rhapsody/The Romantics (Mäster Olofs-gården; 1939)
 Evening Cabaret For the Entire Family (Mäster Olofs-gården; 1939)
 Lucky Per's Journey (Mäster Olofs-gården; 1939)
 The Hangman/The Golden Chariot (Mäster Olofs-gården; 1939)
 Swanwhite (Mäster Olofs-gården; 1940)
 The Merchant of Venice (Norra Latin; 1940)
 The Pelican (Kårhusscenen; 1940)
 Return (at ?; 1940)
 The Hour Glass/The Pot of Broth (Stortorget 3 IV; 1940)
 Macbeth (Mäster-Olofs-gården; 1940)
 The Black Glove (Mäster Olofs-gården; 1940)
 In Betlehem (Mäster Olofs-gården; 1940)
 Bluebird (Medborgarteatern - Sagoteatern; 1941)
 A Midsummer Night's Dream (Medborgarteatern - Sagoteatern; 1941)
 A Ghost Sonata (Medborgarteatern; 1941)
 The Tinder Box (Medborgarhuset; 1941)
 The Father (Folke Walder's tour at Kårhusscenen; 1941)
 A Midsummer Night's Dream (Norra Latin; 1942)
 Death of Punch (SU - Student Theatre; 1942)
 Beppo the Clown (Medborgarhuset/Folkparkerna; 1942)
 Little Red Riding Hood (Medborgarhuset/Folkparkerna; 1942)
 Sniggel snuggel / The Three Stupidities (Medborgarteatern - Sagoteatern; 1942)
 The Fun Fair (Kårhusscenen; 1943)
 Niels Ebbesen (Borgarskolan; 1943)
 En däjlig rosa (A beautiful rose) (Folkparkerna; 1943)
 Geography and Love (Folkparkerna; 1943)
 Just Before Awakening (Kårhusscenen; 1943)
 U-boat 39 (Dramatikerstudion; 1943)
 When the Devil Makes an Offer (SU - Student Theatre; 1943)
 The Tinder Box (Helsingborg City Theatre; 1944)
 Macbeth (Helsingborg City Theatre; 1944)
 When the Devil Makes an Offer (Helsingborg City Theatre; 1944)
 The Ascheberg Widow at Wittskövle (Helsingborg City Theatre; 1944)
 Little Red Riding Hood (Boulevardteatern; 1944)
 The Gambling Hall/Mr. Sleeman Cometh (Borgarskolan; 1944)
 The Hotel Room (Boulevardteatern; 1944)
 The Pelican (Malmö City Theatre, Intiman; 1945)
 Rabies (Helsingborg City Theatre/radio theatre; 1945)
 Jacobowsky and the Colonel (Helsingborg City Theatre; 1945)
 Reduce Morals (Helsingborg City Theatre; 1945)
 The Legend (Helsingborg City Theatre; 1945)
 Kriss-Krass-Filibom: New Year's Cabaret (Helsingborg City Theatre; 1945)
 Summer (radio theatre; 1946)
 Caligula (Gothenburg City Theatre; 1946)
 Rachel and the Cinema Doorman (Malmö City Theatre; 1946)
 Requiem (Helsingborg City Theatre/radio theatre; 1946)
 Playing with Fire (radio theatre; 1947)
 Unto My Fear (Gothenburg City Theatre; 1947)
 The Waves (radio theatre; 1947)
 Magic (Gothenburg City Theatre; 1947)
 The Dutchman (radio theatre; 1947)
 The Day Ends Early (Gothenburg City Theatre; 1947)
 Mother Love (at ?; 1948)
 Thieves' Carnival (Gothenburg City Theatre; 1948)
 Lodolezzi Sings (radio theatre; 1948)
 Macbeth (Gothenburg City Theatre; 1948)
 Dancing on the Pier (Gothenburg City Theatre; 1948)
 Come Up Empty (radio theatre; 1949)
 A Streetcar Named Desire (Gothenburg City Theatre; 1949)
 The Restless Heart (Gothenburg City Theatre; 1949)
 A Shadow / Medea (Intiman; 1950)
 The Three-penny Opera (Intiman; 1950)
 Divine Words (Gothenburg City Theatre; 1950)
 The People of Värmland (radio theatre; 1951)
 The Rose Tattoo (Norrköping-Linköping City Theatre; 1951)
 Summer (radio theatre; 1951)
 The Country Girl (Folkparkerna; 1951)
 The City (radio theatre; 1951)
 Light in the Schack (Dramaten; 1951)
 The Restless Heart (radio theatre; 1952)
 The Crown Bride (Malmö City Theatre; 1952)
 The Day Ends Early (radio theatre; 1952)
 Easter (radio theatre; 1952)
 Blood Wedding (radio theatre; 1952)
 Murder at Barjärna (Malmö City Theatre; 1952)
 Crimes and Crimes (radio theatre; 1952)
 The Guiltburden of the Night (radio theatre; 1952)
 The Castle (Malmö City Theatre, Intiman; 1953)
 Six Characters in Search of an Author (Malmö City Theatre, Intiman; 1953)
 The Dutchman (radio theatre; 1953)
 A Caprice (radio theatre; 1953)
 Unto My Fear (radio theatre; 1953)
 The Apple-Tree Table (radio theatre; 1954)
 Twilight Games (Malmö City Theatre; 1954)
 The Merry Widow (Malmö City Theatre; 1954)
 Wood Painting (radio theatre; 1954)
 The Ghost Sonata (Malmö City Theatre; 1954)
 The Monk Strolls in the Meadow (at ?; 1955)
 The Ball (radio theatre; 1955)
 Wood Painting (Malmö City Theatre, Intiman; 1955)
 The Tea House of the August Moon (Malmö City Theatre; 1955)
 Don Juan (Malmö City Theatre; 1955)
 Leah and Rachel (Malmö City Theatre; 1955)
 Erik XIV (Malmö City Theatre; 1956)
 Portrait of a Madonna (radio theatre; 1956)
 Cat on a Hot Tin Roof (Malmö City Theatre; 1956)
 The Tunnel (radio theatre; 1956)
 Everyman (radio theatre; 1956)
 Vox humana (radio theatre; 1956)
 The Poor Bride (Malmö City Theatre; 1956)
 Grandma and Our Lord (radio theatre; 1956)
 The Misanthrope (Malmö City Theatre; 1957)
 Counterfeiters (radio theatre; 1957)
 The Prisoner (radio theatre; 1957)
 Peer Gynt (Malmö City Theatre; 1957)
 The People of Värmland (Malmö City Theatre; 1958)
 He Who Nothing Owns (radio theatre; 1958)
 Ur-Faust (Malmö City Theatre; 1958)
 The Legend (Malmö City Theatre/radio theatre; 1958)
 First Warning (radio theatre; 1960)
 The Rake's Progress (Royal Swedish Opera; 1961)
 Playing with Fire (radio theatre; 1961)
 The Seagull (Dramaten; 1961)
 The Legend (Dramaten; 1963)
 Who's Afraid of Virginia Woolf? (Dramaten; 1963)
 Hedda Gabler (Dramaten; 1964)
 Three Knives from Wei (Dramaten; 1964)
 Tiny Alice (Dramaten; 1965)
 Don Juan (Dramaten at Chinateatern; 1965)
 School for Wives/The Criticism of the School for Wives (Dramaten; 1966)
 The Investigation (Dramaten/radio theatre; 1966)
 Six Characters in Search of an Author (Nationaltheatret; 1967)
 Woyzeck (Dramaten; 1969)
 Hedda Gabler (Royal National Theatre/Cambridge Theatre; 1970)
 The Dream Play (Dramaten; 1970)
 Show (Dramaten; 1971)
 The Wild Duck (Dramaten; 1972)
 The Misanthrope (Det Kongelige Teater/TV; 1973)
 The Ghost Sonata (Dramaten; 1973)
 To Damascus (Dramaten; 1974)
 Twelfth Night, or What You Will (Dramaten; 1975)
 A Dream Play (Residenztheater München; 1977)
 Three Sisters (Residenztheater München; 1978)
 Hedda Gabler (Residenztheater München; 1979)
 Tartuffe (Residenztheater München; 1979)
 Yvonne, Princess of Burgundy (Residenztheater München; 1980)
 Nora/Julie/Scenes from a Marriage (Residenztheater/Marstall; 1981)
 Dom Juan (Landestheater Salzburg/Cuvilliéstheater München; 1983)
 A Hearsay (radio theatre; 1984)
 The Dance of the Rainsnakes (Residenztheater München; 1984)
 King Lear (Dramaten; 1984)
 Miss Julie (Dramaten; 1985)
 John Gabriel Borkman (Residenztheater München; 1985)
 Hamlet (Dramaten; 1986)
 A Dream Play (Dramaten; 1986)
 Long Day's Journey into Night (Dramaten; 1988)
 A Doll's House (Dramaten; 1989)
 Madame de Sade (Dramaten; 1989 - also TV theatre 1992)
 A Spiritual Matter (radio theatre; 1990)
 Peer Gynt (Dramaten; 1991)
 The Bacchae (Royal Swedish Opera/SVT/CD; 1991)
 Miss Julie (BAM; 1991)
 The Time and the Room (Dramaten; 1993)
 The Last Gasp (SFI/Dramaten; 1993)
 The Winter's Tale (Dramaten; 1994)
 Goldberg Variations (Dramaten; 1994)
 Yvonne, Princess of Burgundy (Dramaten; 1995)
 The Misanthrope (Dramaten; 1995)
 The Bacchae (Dramaten; 1996)
 Harald & Harald (Dramaten; 1996)
 The Imagemakers (Dramaten; 1998)
 Storm Weather (radio theatre; 1999)
 Mary Stuart (Dramaten; 2000)
 The Ghost Sonata (Dramaten; 2000)
 John Gabriel Borkman (radio theatre; 2001)
 Ghosts (Dramaten; 2002)
 The Pelican / Death Island (radio theatre; 2003)
 Rosmersholm (radio theatre; 2004)

Sources

See also
 Ingmar Bergman filmography

External links
 

Ingmar Bergman
Swedish entertainment-related lists
Theatre-related lists